Manfred Roeder (6 February 1929 – 30 July 2014) was a German lawyer and Neo-Nazi terrorist. Roeder was a prominent Holocaust denier.

Life
Born in Berlin, Roeder attended the National Political Institute of Education in Plön. As a teenage soldier, he participated of the Battle of Berlin in 1945. After the Second World War he was for a time a member of Germany's CDU party. After leaving the party he forged ties with the far-right political scene in Germany and abroad, including the Ku Klux Klan. 

Roeder's career was marked by an abundance of criminal charges, including resistance against state authority, and battery. Two people were murdered in these attacks. Roeder was classified as a terrorist by German legal authorities as a result of these activities.

In 1997, the British current affairs program Panorama said that in 1995, Roeder had appeared, by invitation, as a speaker at the German military's officer training academy in Hamburg. This scandal, as well as the fact that Roeder had received financial donations from the military, led to the sacking of the academy's commander and the instatement of Rear-Admiral Rudolf Lange as his replacement, with the goal of restoring the good reputation of the academy.

In 1997, Roeder stood as the candidate of the far-right NPD in Stralsund in Mecklenburg-Vorpommern during the parliamentary elections, promoting himself as "Chancellor alternative 1998", but was unsuccessful.

Roeder died on 30 July 2014 at the age of 85.

Criminal record
Because of his integral role in a terrorist organisation Roeder was sentenced to 13 years in prison in 1982. He had planned a fire bomb attack which killed two Vietnamese refugees in August 1980. He was released in 1990, after serving two-thirds of his sentence, for good behaviour and a perceived social rehabilitation. 

In 1996 Roeder, together with other far-right extremists, perpetrated an attack on an exhibition in Erfurt detailing the role of the Wehrmacht in Nazi Germany, for which he was charged with property damage and fined DM-4,500. After being sentenced to prison by the state courts of Schwerin and Rostock under Germany's Volksverhetzung law (incitement to hatred), and for other crimes, he was given a further ten months in September 2004 by the state court of Frankfurt for contempt of the state. In February 2005, a further sentencing for the same crime was passed by the court of Schwalmstadt.  On 12 May 2005, he began a prison sentence in Gießen, but he was released shortly after on health grounds.

Notes

Much of this article is translated from the German Wikipedia article of 5 March 2007.

External link

1929 births
2014 deaths
Politicians from Berlin
Christian Democratic Union of Germany politicians
National Democratic Party of Germany politicians
German military personnel of World War II
German people convicted of Holocaust denial
People convicted on terrorism charges
German nationalists
German neo-Nazis
Neo-Nazi politicians in Germany